Goran Dimitrijević may refer to:
 Goran Dimitrijević (basketball player) (born 1970), Macedonian former basketball player
 Goran Dimitrijević (journalist) (born 1969), Serbian journalist, radio and television presenter and translator